Łucja Pietrzak  (born 27 December 1995) is a Polish track cyclist, representing Poland at international competitions. She won the silver medal at the 2016 UEC European Track Championships in the team pursuit, but only participated in the qualifying round and semi-final.

Career results
2014
1st Scratch Race, International Track Women & Men (U23)
2015
1st Scratch Race, Grand Prix Minsk
6 giorni delle rose - Fiorenzuola (U23)
1st Scratch Race
3rd Points Race
2016
2nd Team Pursuit, Grand Prix of Poland (with Monika Graczewska, Justyna Kaczkowska  and Daria Pikulik)
3rd Omnium, Panevežys
3rd  Team Pursuit, UEC U23 European Championships (with Monika Graczewska, Justyna Kaczkowska  and Daria Pikulik)

References

1995 births
Living people
Polish female cyclists
Polish track cyclists
Place of birth missing (living people)
21st-century Polish women